Saviano is an Italian surname. Notable people with the surname include: 

 Angelo Saviano (born 1958), American politician
 Antonino Saviano (born 1984), Italian football player
 Josh Saviano (born 1976), American child actor and lawyer
 Nick Saviano (born 1956), American tennis player and coach
 Phil Saviano (1952–2021), American activist
 Roberto Saviano (born 1979), Italian writer, essayist, and screenwriter
 Steve Saviano (born 1981), American ice hockey player
 Tamara Saviano, American country music producer and author

Italian-language surnames